Tank Zam Dam (ٹانک زام ڈیم) is a proposed dam located in Tank District, Khyber Pakhtunkhwa, Pakistan.

References

Dams in Pakistan
Hydroelectric power stations in Pakistan
Tank District
Dams in Khyber Pakhtunkhwa